Thailand national team may refer to:
 Thailand national basketball team
 Thailand national badminton team
 Thailand national baseball team
 Thailand national cricket team
 Thailand national women's cricket team
 Thailand women's national handball team
 Thailand national ice hockey team
 Thailand national rugby union team
 Thailand national rugby sevens team
 Thailand women's national rugby union team\
 Thailand national football team
 Thailand national under-17 football team
 Thailand national under-20 football team
 Thailand national under-23 football team
 Thailand national beach soccer team
 Thailand women's national football team
 Thailand national futsal team
 Thailand men's national volleyball team
 Thailand women's national volleyball team